The Academy of Persian Language and Literature (APLL) (Farhangestân-e Zabân-o Adab-e Fârsi) is the regulatory body for the Persian language, headquartered in Tehran, Iran. Formerly known as the Academy of Iran (Farhangestân-e Iran), it was founded on May 20, 1935, by the initiative of Reza Shah, the founder of Pahlavi dynasty.

The academy acts as the official authority on the language, and contributes to linguistic research on Persian and other languages of Iran.

History

Early efforts
The first official attentions to the necessity of protecting the Persian language against foreign words, and to the standardization of Persian orthography, were under the reign of Naser al-Din Shah of the Qajar dynasty in 1871. After Naser al-Din Shah, Mozaffar al-Din Shah ordered the establishment of the first Persian association in 1903. This association officially declared that it used Persian and Arabic as acceptable sources for coining words. The ultimate goal was to prevent books from being printed with wrong use of words. According to the executive guarantee of this association, the government was responsible for wrongfully-printed books. Words coined by this association, such as rāh-āhan for "railway", were printed in Soltani Newspaper; but the association was eventually closed due to inattention.

A scientific association was founded in 1911, resulting in a dictionary called Words of Scientific Association, which was completed in the future and renamed Katouzian Dictionary.

Establishment of the academy
The first academy for the Persian language was founded on May 20, 1935, under the name Academy of Iran. It was established by the initiative of Reza Shah, and mainly by Hekmat e Shirazi and Mohammad Ali Foroughi, all prominent names in the nationalist movement of the time.

Ferdowsi, in fact, was a motivation behind Reza Shah's decision to remove the foreign loanwords from Persian, replacing them with Persian equivalents. In 1934, Reza Shah ordered to rebuild Ferdowsi's tomb and set up a country-wide ceremony in honor of a thousand years of Persian literature since the time of Ferdowsi, titled Ferdowsi Millenary Celebration, inviting notable Iranian and foreign scholars.

The members of the academy included a number of notable literary figures and highly celebrated scholars upon its foundation, including Abbas Eqbal Ashtiani, Mohammad-Taqi Bahar, Ali-Akbar Dehkhoda, Mohammad Ali Foroughi, Badiozzaman Forouzanfar, Homayun Forouzanfar, Qasem Ghani, Abdolazim Gharib, Mohammad Ghazvini, Mohammad Hejazi, Ali-Asghar Hekmat, Mahmoud Hessabi, Mohammad-Ali Jamalzadeh, Ahmad Matin-Daftari, Saeed Nafisi, Ebrahim Pourdavoud, Isa Sadiq, Zabihollah Safa, Ali Akbar Siassi, and Rashid Yasemi.

Some foreign scholars were also involved, such as Arthur Christensen (from Denmark), Muhammad Husayn Haykal (from Egypt), Abduqodir Maniyozov (from Tajikistan), Henry Masset (from France), Raf'at Pasha (from Egypt), Jan Rypka (from Czechoslovakia), Dodikhudo Saymiddinov (from Tajikistan), and Muhammadjon Shakuri (from Tajikistan) and Syed Waheed Ashraf (from India).

The academy was a key institution in the struggle to re-build Iran as a nation-state after the collapse of the Qajar dynasty. During the 1930s and 1940s, the academy led massive campaigns to replace the many Arabic, French, and Greek loanwords whose immense use in Persian during the centuries preceding the foundation of the Pahlavi dynasty had created a literary language considerably different from the spoken Persian of the time.

Functions
The academy strives to protect the integrity of the Persian language. It heads the academic efforts for linguistic research on the Persian language and its sister Iranian languages. It has also created an official orthography of Persian.

The attention of the academy has also been towards the persistent infiltration of Persian, like many other languages, with foreign words, as a result of the globalization process. The academy constantly campaigns for the use of Persian equivalents of new loanwords. If no equivalents exist, it has the task of linguistically deriving such words from existing Persian roots, and actively promoting the adoption of these new coinages in the daily lives. The Iranian law requires those equivalents to be used in the official media, governmental affairs, and product management of all companies.

The Encyclopedia of Persian Language and Literature in South Asia 

The Encyclopedia of Persian Language and Literature in South Asia (India, Pakistan and Bangladesh) was established in 1993 in order to compile the Encyclopedia of Persian Language and Literature in South Asia, presenting the range of Iranian-Islamic language and culture and its impact on the subcontinent.

Demonstrating the contribution of Iranian and Islamic culture and the role of Persian language and literature in the history and culture of this region, as well as examining the long-standing commonalities and connections of these two ancient lands, especially in the post-Islamic period, is the main structure of this encyclopedia.

Membership
The academy members are selected from masters of Persian literature and linguistics. After the 1979 Revolution, Hassan Habibi was appointed as the academy's president, and he remained in that position until his death due to heart failure in January 2013. The current president is Gholam-Ali Haddad-Adel.

The following is a list of both living and deceased permanent members of the academy since the 1979 Revolution.

Permanent members

Current
 Abdolmohammad Ayati
 Hassan Anvari
 Mahmood Abedi
 Kamran Fani
 Ahmad Samiei Gilani
 Badrozzaman Gharib
 Gholam-Ali Haddad-Adel (president)
 Hossein Masoumi Hamedani
 Gholam Sarvar Homayoun (from Afghanistan)
 Houshang Moradi Kermani
 Bahaoddin Khorramshahi
 Mohammad Dabir Moghaddam
 Mehdi Mohaghegh
 Fatollah Mojtabaei
 Mohammad Ali Movahhed
 Abolhassan Najafi
 Salim Neysari
 Nasrollah Pourjavady
 Fazlollah Qodsi (from Afghanistan)
 Ali Ravaghi
 Esmaeil Sa'dat
 Ali-Ashraf Sadeghi
 Yadollah Samareh
 Bahman Sarkarati
 Mohammad Jafar Yahaghi
 Mohammad Hossein Yamin (from Afghanistan)

Deceased
 Qeysar Aminpour
 Ahmad Aram
 Mohammad Taqi Danesh Pajouh
 Hamid Farzam
 Hassan Habibi (former president)
 Javad Hadidi
 Mohammad Khansari
 Abdolreza Houshang Mahdavi
 Abdolghader Meniasov (from Tajikistan)
 Mostafa Mogharebi
 Muhammadjon Shakuri (from Tajikistan)
 Mohammad Mohit Tabatabaei
 Ahmad Tafazzoli

Announcement of the Academy about the name of the Persian language in foreign languages
On November 19, 2005, the Academy of the Persian Language and Literature delivered a pronouncement on the name of the Persian language, rejecting any use of the word Farsi (instead of English Persian, German Persisch, Spanish persa, French persan, etc.) in foreign languages.

The announcement reads:
 Persian has been used in a variety of publications including cultural, scientific, and diplomatic documents for centuries and, therefore, it carries a very significant historical and cultural meaning. Hence, changing Persian to Farsi would negate this established important precedent.
 Changing the usage from Persian to Farsi may give the impression that "Farsi" is a new language, although this may well be the intention of some users of Farsi.
 Changing the usage may also give the impression that "Farsi" is a dialect used in some parts of Iran rather than the predominant (and official) language of the country.
 The word Farsi has never been used in any research paper or university document in any Western language, and the proposal to begin using it would create doubt and ambiguity about the name of the official language of Iran.

Supporting this announcement, gradually other institutions and literary figures separately took similar actions throughout the world.

See also
 Iranian studies
 Persian studies

References

1935 establishments in Iran
Organizations established in 1935
Cultural organisations based in Iran
Language regulators
Persian language
Persian literature
Education in Iran
Iran